Alvin Johnson may refer to:

Alvin J. Johnson (1827–1884), American publisher
Alvin Saunders Johnson (1874–1971), American economist
Al "Carnival Time" Johnson (Alvin Lee Johnson, born 1939), American singer and piano player
Alvin Johnson (serial killer) (born 1941), American serial killer

See also
Alvin M. Johnston (1914–1998), test pilot
Al Johnson (disambiguation)